Zelota spathomelina is a species of beetle in the family Cerambycidae. It was described by Charles Joseph Gahan in 1902. It is known from Borneo.

References

Mesosini
Beetles described in 1902